The Neiwan Theater is a movie theater and restaurant in Neiwan Village, Hengshan Township, Hsinchu County, Taiwan.

History
The theater was originally constructed during the Japanese rule of Taiwan from an old lumber yard. In 2002, it was renovated and a restaurant was added.

Architecture
The theater is a two-story building.

Transportation
The museum is accessible within walking distance west from Neiwan Station of the Taiwan Railways.

See also
 Cinema of Taiwan

References

Buildings and structures in Hsinchu County
Restaurants in Taiwan
Cinemas in Taiwan